Jessica Frech is an American pop/folk singer-songwriter from Nashville, Tennessee.  Jessica is attending Belmont University, majoring in songwriting.

Frech gained worldwide notoriety with the release of the "People of Walmart" music video on YouTube. The comedy video features images from the People of Walmart photo blog along with an original score written by Frech. Shortly after release, the video went viral with multi-millions of views. The video has been featured on G4's Attack of the Show!, Fox News, Billboard, Jimmy Fallon, AOL, and MSNBC.
"People of Walmart" video gained the attention of Hyundai which hired Jessica to create two commercials for their 2011 holiday campaign.

On August 20, 2009 Frech released her debut album Grapefruit. The album features six original songs recorded by Grammy nominated, Bart Pursley

Frech released her first Christmas album Pull My Finger To Hear Jingle Bells on December 6, 2011. The album contains two traditional Christmas songs "Jingle Bells" and "We Wish You A Merry Christmas" along with two originals.

On December 18, 2011 Frech started a Kickstarter Campaign to fund her first full-length album "Reality".  The original goal of $8,000 was met in less than 72 hrs. On February 5, 2012 the project was successfully funded by 718 backers pledging a total of $28,938.

Frech joined the second annual national DigiTour for two shows in Houston, Texas on March 15, 2012 and Dallas, Texas on March 16, 2012.

Frech's first full-length album Reality was released on March 20, 2012. The album has 12 songs. One track, "I Tried to Die Young", features Melanie Safka.

YouTube 
Frech's YouTube channel has over 12 million views.

Videos

Awards and achievements 
Break.com named music video "People of Walmart" as the No. 1 viral video of 2011

Named Hot-Up-N-Comer of 2010 by Woman's Radio

The Independent Singer Songwriters Association 2009 Honorable Mention for the song "Grapefruit"

Placed 5th on OurStage.com for 2009 Folk Song of The Year for the song "Reality"

Discography

Albums

Singles / Tracks

References

External links 

 Jessica Frech on YouTube

American folk singers
1991 births
American women singer-songwriters
Living people
Singer-songwriters from Tennessee
American folk-pop singers
21st-century American singers
21st-century American women singers